Robert McGovern may refer to:

 Robert M. McGovern (1928–1951), United States Army Officer and Medal of Honor recipient
 Robert McGovern (businessman), American businessman